Charis SIL  is a transitional serif typeface developed by SIL International based on Bitstream Charter, one of the first fonts designed for laser printers. The font offers four family members: roman, bold, italic, and bold italic.

Its design goal is to "provide a single Unicode-based font family that would contain a comprehensive inventory of glyphs needed for almost any Roman- or Cyrillic-based writing system, whether used for phonetic or orthographic needs."

Charis SIL supports Graphite, OpenType, and AAT technologies for advanced rendering features.  Along with Doulos SIL and Gentium, it is licensed under the SIL Open Font License (OFL), and can be downloaded free of charge.

Version 6.2 of the font, with over 3,800 glyphs, current , was released on 1 February 2023.

Variant forms of many characters can be chosen in the word-processor. For example, for primer-style 'a' and 'g', append ss01=1 to the name of the font in the font-selection window. (Features are appended with a colon and linked with an ampersand – see images at left.) Alternatively, customized versions of the fonts can be created with TypeTuner, prior to download, that have those forms preset. 

Features that may be chosen include small capitals, primer-style 'a' and 'g', roman-style 'a' and 'g' in italic typeface, variant forms of capital 'Ŋ', large modifier apostrophe and saltillo, Vietnamese-style diacritics, Serbian-style italics (in Cyrillic), staveless tone letters, and automatic fractions.

Phonetician John C. Wells recommended Charis SIL for displaying IPA symbols.

Sources

References

External links

Charis SIL homepage
Smart Unicode typefaces released under free license, Linux.com article on Charis SIL and its release as open source.
Using IPA fonts with Mac OS X: The Comprehensive Guide, a guide to setting up and using Charis SIL and the International Phonetic Alphabet characters on Mac OS X
TypeTuner Web homepage

Transitional serif typefaces
Slab serif typefaces
Free software Unicode typefaces
Typefaces and fonts introduced in 2006
IPA typefaces